OTJ Palárikovo is a Slovak football team, based in the town of Palárikovo. The club was founded in -.

References

Palarikovo